Abbas Mirza (August 26, 1789October 25, 1833) was a Qajar crown prince of Iran. He developed a reputation as a military commander during the Russo-Persian War of 1804–1813 and the Russo-Persian War of 1826–1828, as well as through the Ottoman–Persian War of 1821–1823. He is furthermore noted as an early modernizer of Persia's armed forces and institutions, and for his death before his father, Fath Ali Shah. 

Abbas was an intelligent prince, possessed some literary taste, and is noteworthy on account of the comparative simplicity of his life.

With Abbas Mirza as the military commander of the Persian forces, Iran lost all of its territories in the Caucasus comprising the South Caucasus and parts of the North Caucasus (Dagestan) to Russia in conformity with the 1813 Treaty of Gulistan and the 1828 Treaty of Turkmenchay, following the outcomes of the 1804–1813 and 1826–1828 wars.

Biography
Abbas Mirza was born on August 26, 1789 in Nava, Mazandaran. He was a younger son of Fath Ali Shah, but on account of his mother's royal birth was destined by his father to succeed him. Considered the favorite son by his father, he was named governor (beglarbeg) of the Azerbaijan region of Persia, in approximately 1798, when he was 10 years old. In 1801, three years after Agha Mohammad Khan's death, the Russians capitalized on the moment, and annexed Kartli-Kakheti. As (Eastern) Georgia had been under intermittent Iranian suzerainty since the early 16th century, this act by the Russians was seen as intrusion into Iranian territory. In 1804, eager to take the rest of Iran's territories, the Russian army led by general Pavel Tsitsianov, besieged, captured and sacked the city of Ganja, thereby initiating the Russo-Persian War (1804–1813). Fath-Ali Shah appointed Abbas Mirza as commander of the expeditionary force of 30,000 men. His aid was eagerly solicited by both England and Napoleon, anxious to checkmate one another in the East, especially as Persia bordered a common rival, namely Imperial Russia. Preferring the friendship of France, Abbas Mirza continued the war against Russia's young General Kotlyarevsky, aged only twenty-nine but his new ally could give him very little assistance.

The early stages of the war following Fath Ali Shah's orders to invade and regain Georgia and the northern parts of the contemporary Azerbaijani Republic ended up in years of relatively territorial stale warfare. However, as Prof. Alexander Mikaberidze adds, Abbas Mirza led the army in an overall disastrous campaign against the Russians, suffering defeats at Gyumri, Kalagiri, the Zagam River (1805), Karakapet (1806), Karababa (1808), Ganja (1809), Meghri, the Aras River, and Akhalkalaki (1810). The tide started to decisively turn as Russia was sending more and more advanced weaponry and increasing numbers of soldiers.  Commanding the southernmost Russian divisions during the long war, Kotlyarevsky defeated the numerically superior Persian army in the Battle of Aslanduz (1812) and in early 1813 stormed and took Lankaran.  The Russians were encamped on the opposite bank of River Aras when his two British advisers Capt Christie and Lt Pottinger told him to post sentry pickets in short order, but Mirza ignored the warnings.  Christie and other British officers tried to rally an army retreating in panic; for days the Russians launched fierce assaults, but at last Christie fell, and Mirza ordered a full retreat.  Complacency cost 10,000 Persian lives; Mirza believing wrongly in the weight of superior numbers.  In spite of the absence of leadership, The Persians at Lenkoran held out for weeks until, breaking through, the Russians slaughtered the garrison of 4,000 officers and men.

In October 1813, with Abbas Mirza still commander-in-chief, Persia was compelled to make a severely disadvantageous peace known as the Treaty of Gulistan, irrevocably ceding swaths of its territory in the Caucasus, comprising present-day Georgia, Dagestan, and most of what most recently became the Republic of Azerbaijan. The only promise the Shah received in return was a lukewarm guarantee the Mirza would succeed to his throne, without let or hindrance.  Persia's dire losses attracted the attention of the British Empire; following the reversal of initial successes, the Russians now posed a serious threat from the Caucasus.

The drastic losses suffered by his forces made him realize that he needed to train Persia's military in the European style of war, and he started sending his students to Europe for military training. By introducing European-style regiments, Abbas Mirza believed it would enable Iran to gain the upper hand over Russia and to reclaim its lost territories.   Influenced by Sultan Selim III's reforms, Abbas Mirza set out to create an Iranian version of the Ottoman Nizam-ı Cedid, and reduce the Qajar dependence on tribal and provincial forces. In 1811 and 1815, two groups were sent to Britain, and in 1812 a printing press was finished in Tabriz as a means to reproduce European military handbooks. Tabriz also saw a gunpowder factory and a munitions depot. The training continued with constant drilling by British advisers, with a focus on the infantry and artillery.

He received his opportunity to test his newly reformed military when the Ottoman–Persian War (1821–1823) began, and they proved themselves adept with several victories. This resulted in a peace treaty signed in 1823 after the Battle of Erzurum. The war was a victory for Persia, especially considering they were outnumbered, and this gave much needed confidence to his forces. His second war with Russia, which began in 1826, started off on a good note as he won back most of the territory lost in the Russo-Persian War (1804–1813); however it ended in a string of costly defeats after which Persia was forced to cede the last of its Caucasian territories, comprising all of what is modern day Armenia, Nakhchivan, the rest of the remainder of the contemporary Azerbaijani Republic that was still in Iranian hands, and Iğdır Province, all conform the 1828 Treaty of Turkmenchay. The eventual loss was due less to his and his armies skill and more to do with lack of reinforcements and overwhelming superiority in numbers. The irrevocable losses, which in total amounted up for all of Qajar Iran's territories in the North Caucasus and the South Caucasus, affected Abbas Mirza severely and his health began to suffer. He also lost enthusiasm for any more military reform. In 1833, he sought to restore order in Khorasan province, which was nominally under Persian supremacy, and while engaged in the task died at Mashhad in 1833. In 1834, his eldest son, Mohammed Mirza, succeeded Fath Ali Shah as the next king. R. G. Watson (History of Persia, 128–9) described him as “the noblest of the Qajar race”.

He is most remembered for his valor in battle and his failed attempts to modernize the Persian army. He was not successful in part due to the lack of government centralization in Iran during the era. Furthermore, it was Abbas Mirza who first dispatched Iranian students to Europe for a western education. He was unable to prove successful in the long run in his wars with Russia as he ended up losing more territory than he gained.

In popular culture 

 Tabriz in Fog: an Iranian historical drama about Abbas Mirza's life.

Sons

 Prince Mohammed Mirza, to become Mohammad Shah Qajar
 Prince Bahram Mirza Mo'ez ed-Dowleh
 Prince Djahangir Mirza
 Prince Bahman Mirza
 Prince Fereydoun Mirza Nayeb-ol-Eyaleh
 Prince Eskandar Mirza
 Prince Khosrow Mirza
 Prince Ghahreman Mirza
 Prince Ardeshir Mirza Rokn ed-Dowleh
 Prince Ahmad Mirza Mo'in ed-Dowleh
 Prince Ja'far Gholi Mirza
 Prince Mostafa Gholi Mirza
 Prince Soltan Morad Mirza Hessam-al-Saltaneh
 Prince Manouchehr Mirza
 Prince Farhad Mirza Mo'tamed ed-Dowleh
 Prince Firouz Mirza Nosrat ed-Dowleh
 Prince Khanlar Mirza Ehtesham ed-Dowleh
 Prince Bahador Mirza
 Prince Mohammad Rahim Mirza
 Prince Mehdi Gholi Mirza
 Prince Hamzeh Mirza Heshmat ed-Dowleh
 Prince Ildirim Bayazid Mirza
 Prince Lotfollah Mirza Shoa'a ed-Dowleh
 Prince Mohammad Karim Mirza
 Prince Ja'ffar Mirza
 Prince Abdollah Mirza

See also 
Set Khan Astvatsatourian
Abbas Mirza Mosque, Yerevan
Russo-Persian Wars
Samson Makintsev
Imperial Crown Jewels of Persia
Military history of Iran

Notes

References

Further reading 
 

Qajar princes
1789 births
1833 deaths
Iranian royalty
Iranian generals
19th-century Iranian military personnel
People of the Russo-Persian Wars
Heirs apparent who never acceded
People from Mazandaran Province
History of Azerbaijan (Iran)
Qajar governors
Burials at Imam Reza Shrine
People from Amol